Majki  is a village in the administrative district of Gmina Pasłęk, within Elbląg County, Warmian-Masurian Voivodeship, in northern Poland.

Notable residents
 Emil Roßmann (1920–2003), Wehrmacht officer

References

Majki